Ram Bir Singh is an Assistant Commandant in the India Border Security Force and was a member of the India national kabaddi team that won an Asiad gold medal in 1998.

References

Living people
Asian Games gold medalists for India
Asian Games medalists in kabaddi
Indian kabaddi players
Indian police officers
Kabaddi players at the 1998 Asian Games
Medalists at the 1998 Asian Games
Year of birth missing (living people)